Vernell Brown Jr. born August 13, 1971 was a jazz and Rhythm & Blues pianist, composer, arranger.

Early life
Starting early in life opened a path to becoming a life-long musician; even as a child Vernell practiced frequently, was surrounded by other musicians, chose his own instruments, and began taking lessons. Vernell started playing piano as a 4 year-old, drums from age 3 to 13.  Vernell picked up the violin when he was 8 and focused on that instrument until high school, but continued with the piano throughout.  

In high school Vernell studied with composer and pianist Terry Trotter and renowned jazz vibraphonist Charlie Shoemake, under whose tutelage Vernell developed quickly. He was recognized by Yamaha and gifted a grand piano and several other keyboards. He was a finalist at the 1988 and 1989 Thelonious Monk Institute of Jazz Piano Competitions.

Vernell was discovered as a teenager when he performed as a substitute pianist at the Recording Academy “Grammy In The Schools” program. The chance substitution brought Vernell to the attention of the co-founder of A&M Records, Jerry Moss who contracted Vernell.

Career

As an 18-year old recording his debut album A Total Eclipse, Vernell had the opportunity to play alongside such illustrious veterans as saxophonist Ernie Watts, bassist Marcus Miller, John Pattitucci, Neil Stubenhause, guitarists Paul Jackson Jr., and Pat Kelley, drummers Stix Hooper and Vinnie Colaiuta, percussionist Lenny Castro, and trumpeter and A&M Records co-founder Herb Alpert. 

The project was designed to introduce listeners to the youth’s already remarkable signature-style and range of musical interests.  Producer Stix Hooper, a founding member of The Jazz Crusaders, lent his insight in providing a fitting backdrop for the jazz project and seasoned it with soul, pop, and R&B.  
Stix Hooper states, "This debut album of Vernell Brown Jr., is an artistic contribution to our planet of significant musical depth, vision and direction.  Vernell at the young age of eighteen, has been given from the Supreme Source, the talent, wisdom, and creative skills necessary to communicate to us, music we can incorporate into our lives.” 
Vernell then released the album Stay Tuned on A&M, taking a more aggressive route, playing with his own band The Nucleus; two tracks, "Whoever You Are" and "Everybody Needs A Friend", features a vocal collaboration with lyricist Will Jennings.

Vernell has collaborated with everyone from Herb Alpert to, Jeffrey Osborne, Ronnie Laws and extensively with Gladys Knight starting in 1994, touring in Europe and the United States. He then recorded Just For You (1994) with Gladys and enjoyed a two-year performance show at the prestigious Flamingo Hilton Hotel on the Las Vegas Strip, listed as the number one show on the strip for a four-year period. Just for You was Gladys' fourth solo LP; it went Gold and was nominated for the 1995 Grammy.

In 1994, Vernell teamed with LA Music Awards nominee Windy Karigianes, to co-write the widely-acclaimed "Butterfly", featuring Herbie Hancock's Headhunters’ Mike Clark and Paul Jackson. "Butterfly" became a hit single. He has also appeared on releases by Craig T. Cooper on Caught Up in a Moment (1999), and by Ronnie Laws on A Tribute to the Legendary Eddie Harris (1997) and Dream a Little (2000).

Joining Kenny Garrett's band

In 2002, Vernell joined the Kenny Garrett Quintet. Vernell recorded Happy People (2002) and Standard of Language (2003) with the quintet. 
With the Kenny Garrett Quintet, Vernell has traveled the world, averaging 40 venues a month and performing at premier international jazz festivals including: The Java Jazz Festival in Jakarta, Indonesia, The Cape Town International Jazz Festival in South Africa, The Montreux Jazz Festival in Switzerland, The Red Sea Jazz Festival in Eilat, Israel, Warsaw Summer Jazz Days in Poland, Jazz à Toulon Festival in France, The Atina Jazz Festival in Italy, Get Closer Jazz Fest in Budapest, Hungary, Port au Prince Int’l Jazz Fest in Haiti, Playboy Jazz Festival in Los Angeles, Washington, DC Jazz Festival, The North Sea Jazz Festival in Rotterdam, Netherlands and more.

Vernell performed on Pushing the World Away (2013), which earned Garrett a Grammy nomination. 

In his downtime, Vernell enjoys working with developing youth musicians and has led a workshop at the Las Vegas Academy for the Arts. 
 
Over the years, many fellow jazz musicians have wondered how Vernell creates his unusual chord progressions and rhythmic patterns. In 2018 Vernell began putting down his explorations on paper, which he’d been doing since high school. The result is the much-anticipated book, The Alpha Pattern Method; A Theory of Composition and Improvisation. 

Recent activities

Most recently, Vernell was the featured artist on the 2019 New York City recording sessions with the Kenny Garrett Quintet: this resulted in the album released in 2021,
Sounds from the Ancestors, which won NAACP award for Outstanding Instrumental Jazz Album. 

Vernell is currently working on his latest studio recording project a compilation of original materials composed and collected over many years. Future looking, Vernell is determined to bring one of his dreams to fruition; he plans to perform some of his Alpha Patterns compositions with a symphonic orchestra and chamber orchestra, which he would arrange for piano, contra bass, cello, viola and violins.

Discography

As leader
A Total Eclipse (A&M, 1990)
Stay Tuned (A&M, 1992)
13 Letters (Verlita Records, 2010)
Do You Really Love Me (Vernell Brown Jr., 2010)

As sideman
With Ronnie Laws
Tribute to the Legendary Eddie Harris (Blue Note, 1997)
Dream a Little (HDH, 2000)
Ronnie Laws – Live! In Concert (Scepterstein Records, 2001)

With Gladys Knight
Gladys Knight - Just For You (MCA Records, 1994)

With Kenny GarrettHappy People (Warner Bros., 2002)Standard of Language (Warner Bros., 2003)Pushing the World Away (Mack Avenue, 2013)Do Your Dance! (Mack Avenue, 2016)Sounds from the Ancestors (Mack Avenue, 2021)

Other guest appearances with

Craig T. Cooper – Whatever Happens In Vegas, Stays In Vegas (from, Nasty Man, 2011)
Kaylene Peoples – A-Tisket, A-Tasket'' (from, My Man, 2015)

References

External links
[ All Music]

American jazz pianists
American male pianists
Living people
1971 births
21st-century American pianists
21st-century American male musicians
American male jazz musicians